The 2013 Americas Rugby Championship season was the fourth season of the Americas Rugby Championship. It took place between 11 and 19 October 2013 in Langford, British Columbia. The tournament featured the same teams as in the 2012 version, Argentina Jaguars, Canada Selects, USA Selects, and Uruguay. Uruguay qualified by placing second, behind Argentina, at the 2013 edition of the South American Rugby Championship.

Teams

 
 
  USA Selects

Standings

Schedule

All times are in PDT (UTC−7).

References

External links
 Official Website

2013
International rugby union competitions hosted by Canada
2013 rugby union tournaments for national teams
2013 in Canadian rugby union
2013 in American rugby union
2013 in Argentine rugby union
rugby union
2013 in North American rugby union
2013 in South American rugby union
October 2013 sports events in Canada